Radhica flavovittata is a species of moth of the  family Lasiocampidae. It is found in India and Taiwan.

Subspecies
Radhica flavovittata flavovittata
Radhica flavovittata taiwanensis (Matsumura, 1927) (Taiwan)
Radhica flavovittata puana Zolotuhin, 1995

References

Moths described in 1879
Lasiocampidae